Rose-Marie "Rosy" Piacentini (born 17 August 1938) is a French former backstroke swimmer. She competed in two events at the 1960 Summer Olympics.

References

External links
 

1938 births
Living people
French female backstroke swimmers
Olympic swimmers of France
Swimmers at the 1960 Summer Olympics
Swimmers from Paris
21st-century French women
20th-century French women